Dumbarton Joint Hospital is a health facility on Cardross Road in Dumbarton, West Dunbartonshire, Scotland. It is managed by NHS Greater Glasgow and Clyde.

History
The facility, which was designed by John McLean Crawford (1854-1950), was established as an infectious diseases hospital in 1898. The hospital joined the National Health Service in 1948 and subsequently focused on provision of geriatric care with some wards specialising in dementia and other mental health difficulties.

References

Hospitals in West Dunbartonshire
1898 establishments in Scotland
Hospitals established in 1898
Hospital buildings completed in 1898
NHS Scotland hospitals